Andrej Martin and Hans Podlipnik were the defending champions but lost in the final to Andre Begemann and Leander Paes by a score of 6–4, 6–4.

Seeds

Draw

References
 Main Draw

2015 ATP Challenger Tour|Thindown Challenger Biella - Doubles